Intimate Strangers (alternative title: Battered) is a 1977 American made-for-television drama film directed by John Llewellyn Moxey and written and produced by Richard and Esther Shapiro.

The film, starring Dennis Weaver, Sally Struthers, Tyne Daly and Larry Hagman, deals with the subject domestic violence and has received positive reviews since its release, acknowledged as "an outstanding social drama" by the TV Guide. Daly received an Emmy Award nomination in the category "Best Supporting Actress".

Plot 
Donald Halston loses a sale of an insurance policy at work, leading to a financial setback. He takes out this personal and financial humiliation on his loving wife Janice. After a fight over her daily spending, he accidentally pushes her, causing her to spill coffee over herself. He immediately apologizes, and Janice does not wait long before forgiving him. The next morning, she runs into an old friend Karen Renshaw, who once left town for Florida but is now working as a drafts woman after her divorce. They quickly rekindle their friendship.

Donald, meanwhile, is convinced by his colleague and friend Mort Burns, to have a boys night out with two attractive women. Donald spends the night with one of the women and cheats on his wife. He returns home at night to a worried Janice, though instead of apologizing, he admits to his unloyalty in a rage, and starts beating her when she gets mad at him for the infidelity. The police quickly arrive due to complaints of neighbors, though Janice lies about the situation to protect her husband.

The next morning, Janice's daughter Peggy, confronts her mother with the domestic violence, and Janice assures her that she will stick by her husband. Donald, meanwhile, visits his unloving father, and learns that the rent for his retirement home has not yet been paid. At the local gym, Mort's wife Marilyn, among others, notice that Janice has multiple bruises on her body, but she denies having a problem. After class, she receives a crisis number for battered women. Even though Donald makes a convincing apology about his behavior, promising her to better his life, Janice attends a self-help meeting with other battered women. There, she reacts in denial when others ask about her husband's violent tendencies, and ends up protecting Donald yet again, despite fearing that Donald will someday hit the children as well.

Donald attempts to make up with Janice by accompanying her to one of Karen's parties. Donald grows jealous when Janice talks to a younger man, and demands that they leave immediately. At home, Janice gets upset for being humiliated, causing Donald to abuse her yet again. This time, the police show up and arrest Donald. Meanwhile, Janice is in hospital and is visited by an attorney, Shaola Reems, to sue her husband. Karen collects Janice's stuff at her home and tells Donald what a horrible man he is. Donald makes another promise to change, but Janice convinces him that he can't do this without the help of a therapist. Karen criticizes Janice for not leaving Donald, but Janice insists that she does not want to be a divorced woman like Karen.

Janice returns home, only to get into a fight with Donald over Karen, and her son Chris gets thrown across the room. Horrified, Janice takes the children and immediately leaves her husband. She attempts to start a new life, which includes a job, though one night Donald breaks into his former home and both chokes and rapes his wife. Even though Donald can't be sued for rape due to 'connubial rights' despite separation, he will be prosecuted for the abuse charges. Donald pleads guilty for a lower penalty, though this deal includes a restraining order from his wife.

Cast
Dennis Weaver as Donald Halston
Sally Struthers as Janice Halston
Tyne Daly as Karen Renshaw (Emmy nomination Best Supporting Actress)
Larry Hagman as Mort Burns
Melvyn Douglas as Donald's father
Brian Andrews as Chris Halston
Quinn Cummings as Peggy Halston
Julian Burton as Dr. James Morgan
Ellen Travolta as Marilyn Burns

References

External links

1977 television films
1977 films
1977 drama films
ABC network original films
Films about domestic violence
Films directed by John Llewellyn Moxey
1970s English-language films
American drama television films
1970s American films